The Evangelical Free Church of Japan (EFCJ) is a Protestant denomination. It was started in 1949 by missionaries from the Evangelical Free Church of America. The Evangelical Free Church of Japan has over 60 churches and was the fastest growing denomination in Japan after World War II. It is a member of the Japan Evangelical Association (JEA).

References

External links
Official website
History

Christian organizations established in 1949
Christian evangelical denominations in Japan
1949 establishments in Japan